Schizosaccharomycetes is a class in the kingdom of fungi. It contains the order Schizosaccharomycetales, the fission yeasts. The genus Schizosaccharomycetes is a broad and ancient clade within Ascomycota including five known fission yeast: 
Schizosaccharomyces pombe, Schizosaccharomyces japonicius, Schizosaccharomyces octosporus, and Schizosaccharomyces cryophilus, and Schizosaccharomyces osmophilus.

References

Yeasts
Fungus classes
Taxa described in 1997